A rural trolley was a type of trolley line that operated through a rural area. Unlike an interurban, it used standard streetcar equipment, and was simply an extension of a city system. It was most common in New England, where settlements were closer together than in the rest of the United States.

References

Passenger rail transport